Man Mandir is a 1971 Bollywood drama film directed by Tapi Chanakya. The film stars Waheeda Rehman and Sanjeev Kumar. This was the first film signed and shot by Rakesh Roshan, although 'Ghar Ghar Ki Kahani' signed after this film was released before 'Man Mandir'.
The music is by Laxmikant Pyarelal.

Plot:

Orphaned at a very young age, Deepak and his sister, Laxmi, live a poor lifestyle. Deepak is introduced to Krishna and soon both get married and live together with Krishna's brother, Ramu. Deepak drives a taxi and it is through his earnings that they all live on. Soon Krishna gets pregnant, much to the delight of the entire household. Ramu has fallen into bad company and steals Krishna's necklace to throw a party for his friends. A kind-hearted wealthy Jeweler, Shyam Lal, returns the necklace to Deepak, as Deepak had returned his suitcase full of cash. Shyam would like his doctor son, Shankar, to get married to Laxmi. A delighted Deepak arranges a meeting at the Lals residence. It is at this meeting that Deepak's life will be turned upside down, for this is where he will find that Laxmi is pregnant; shock and tragedy will follow when shortly thereafter Ramu will be run down by a car; his wife will give birth to a baby boy and pass away, and Laxmi will drown herself in a river. Looks like fate has turned it's back on Deepak as he may be destined to bring up the child on his own.

Cast

Soundtrack

External links
 

1971 films
1970s Hindi-language films
1971 drama films
Films scored by Laxmikant–Pyarelal
Films directed by Tapi Chanakya